The Kurek Formation is a late Oxfordian (Late Jurassic) geologic formation of the Kugitang Svita in Turkmenistan and Uzbekistan. Fossil sauropod tracks have been reported from the formation.

Etymology 
The formation is named after Mount Kurek, near Langar, Uzbekistan.

Description 
Also tracks were preserved at that were probably made in shallow water, showing, in some parts, ripple marks.

Fossil content 
Among the following fossils have been found in the Kurek Formation:

Dinosaurs
 Gissarosaurus tetrafalangensis

Ichnofossils
 Megalosauripus uzbekistanicus
 Mirsosauropus tursunzadei
 Regarosauropus manovi
 Shirkentosauropus shirkentensis
 Therangospodus pandemicus

Invertebrates
 Bivalvia indet.

See also 
 List of dinosaur-bearing rock formations
 List of stratigraphic units with sauropodomorph tracks
 Sauropod tracks
 Bissekty Formation
 Bostobe Formation
 Qiketai, Toutunhe, Shishugou and Qigu Formations, fossiliferous formations of the Junggar Basin, Xinjiang
 Haifanggou Formation, Hebei Basin, Hebei
 Oxfordian formations
 Oxford Clay, England
 Tendaguru Formation, fossiliferous formation of Tanzania
 Cañadón Calcáreo Formation, fossiliferous formation of the Cañadón Asfalto Basin, Argentina

References

Bibliography

Further reading 
 F. Fanti, M. Contessi, A. Nigarov and P. Esenov. 2013. New data on two large dinosaur tracksites from the Upper Jurassic of eastern Turkmenistan (Central Asia). Ichnos 20:54-71
 V. P. Novikov and M. R. Dzhalilov. 1988. Litologicheskaya interpretatsiya mestonakhozhdeniy sledov dinozavrov i Tadzhikistane [A lithological interpretation of localities with dinosaurian traces in Tajikistan]. In T. N. Bogdanova, L. I. Khosatzky, & A. A. Istchenko (eds.), Sledy Zhiznedeyatel'nosti i Dinamika Sredy v Drevnikh Biotopakh. Trudy XXX Sessii Vsesoyuznogo Paleontologicheskogo Obshchestva i VII Sessii Ukrainskogo Paleontologicheskogo Obshchestva [Fossil Traces of Vital Activity and Dynamics of the Environment in Ancient Biotopes. Transactions of the XXX Session of All-Union Paleontological Society and the VII Session of the Ukrainian Paleontological Society]. Naukova Dumka, Kiev 58-69
 K. N. Amanniyazov. 1985. Ob unikalnykh sledakh verkhneyurskikh dinozavrov v Turkmenistane [Unique tracks of dinosaurs in the Upper Jurassic of Turkmenistan]. In M. P. Dzhalilov, V. P. Novikov (eds.), Problemy Osvoeniya Pustyn [Problems of Desert Development], Institute of Geology, Academy of Sciences Turkmenistan 2:23-29

Geologic formations of Turkmenistan
Geologic formations of Uzbekistan
Jurassic System of Asia
Oxfordian Stage
Limestone formations
Mudstone formations
Lagoonal deposits
Ichnofossiliferous formations
Fossiliferous stratigraphic units of Asia
Paleontology in Turkmenistan
Paleontology in Uzbekistan